The Zee Cine Awards 2019 ceremony celebrated the best of Indian Hindi-language films of 2018. The ceremony was held on 19 March 2019 at the MMDRA Ground at the Bandra Kurla Complex in Mumbai and broadcast on 31 March 2019 on Zee Cinema. The main hosts of the event were Vicky Kaushal and Kartik Aaryan, while Malaika Arora and Ayushmann Khurrana and Aparshakti Khurana hosted a segment each.

Padmaavat led the ceremony with 14 nominations, followed by Andhadhun and Raazi with 9 nominations each.

Padmaavat won 6 awards, including Best Director (for Sanjay Leela Bhansali) and Best Actress (for Deepika Padukone), thus becoming the most-awarded film at the ceremony.

Winners and nominees
Winners are listed first and highlighted in boldface.

Main awards

Viewers' choice
Nominations for the viewer's choice awards were announced on 23 February 2019 and voting ended on 13 March 2019.

Special Awards
Extraordinary Contribution to Indian Cinema
Hema Malini

Extraordinary Jodi of the Year
Neena Gupta and Gajraj Rao – Badhaai Ho as Priyamvada Kaushik and Jeetender Kaushik

Extraordinary Icon for Social Change
Sonam Kapoor Ahuja – Pad Man as Pari Walia

Extraordinary Performance of the Year
Ayushmann Khurrana – Andhadhun as Akash

Technical Awards

Films with multiple nominations and awards

Performers and presenters
The following individuals performed musical numbers or presented awards.

Performers

Presenters

See also
64th Filmfare Awards
25th Screen Awards

References

External links
Zee Cine Awards 

Zee Cine Awards
2019 Indian film awards